Sundbyberg Municipality (Sundbybergs kommun or Sundbybergs stad) is a municipality in Stockholm County in east central Sweden, just north of the capital Stockholm. Sundbyberg is wholly within the Stockholm urban area and has a 100% urban population.

Sundbyberg was detached from Bromma (which since 1916 is in Stockholm Municipality) in 1888 as a market town (köping). It got the title of a city in 1927. In 1949 parts of Solna Municipality and Spånga Municipality (when the rest of Spånga was amalgamated into Stockholm) were added. The municipality prefers to call itself a city, which, however, has no legal significance.

History
Sundbyberg was for a long time only an area of small agriculture value and most of all used as a place to spend summer for rich families in the city. In 1863 almost the entire area was bought by Anders Petter Löfström, including Duvbo Estate, who began building houses there. In 1870 the first industrial plot was sold and from there the town did expand with railroad, houses, industries and community services of all kind. A. P. Löfström also donated to the municipality, all  land for roads, streets, parks, school, church and other public areas.

In 1888 Sundbyberg municipality was formed with 1,133 inhabitants, splitting off from Bromma. At the time the municipality only constituted Central Sundbyberg and the undeveloped Storskogen. Sundbyberg was known in its early years for its beer, its spirited political discourses, its muddy streets, and the danger of the streets at night (nowadays the crime-hit areas are Hallonbergen and Rissne instead). Sales of land was aimed at workers and industry, and the relative lack of public services caused a strong cooperative spirit to form. Suburbs bordering Sundbyberg were also built – Lilla Alby and Mariehäll in the 1880s and Duvbo around 1900. While trains stopped in Sundbyberg, they did so at a low frequency, and most commuters used the steam boat. In 1910 a tram line was built from Stockholm and Råsunda to the municipal border, and then into Sundbyberg in 1928, running until 1959.

A new city plan was established in 1941, prescribing the construction of lamellhus, rectangular multi-residential buildings with typically four floors, leading to the demolishment of most of the wooden houses in Sundbyberg in the 1940s, while brick or concrete buildings were kept. Many industrial buildings were converted to residential use at the same time. Rising housing prices led to a more densely built suburb than envisioned in the city plan, as well as cause Sundbyberg to rapidly lose its industrial character.

In 1946 Sundbyberg municipality, which by then had 15,000 inhabitants, bought Storskogen, with the first homes going up there in 1952. In 1949 Spånga municipality was split between neighbouring municipalities, giving Duvbo, Ursvik and some other land to Sundbyberg. Lilla Alby was transferred from Solna municipality to Sundbyberg at the same time. Since the 1950s when Storskogen was built, Sundbyberg has expanded one district each decade, with Ör built in the 1960s, Hallonbergen and its metro line (which also serves Storskogen and Ör) in the 1970s, Rissne and its metro line (which also serves Central Sundbyberg and Lilla Alby) in the 1980s, Brotorp and Stora Ursvik in the 2000s.

Economy
The roughly 50,000 inhabitants live in about 20,000 households. The industrial policy of the municipality is to provide one job opportunity for every household, with there being around 23,000 jobs in the municipality (in 2015). So unlike other municipalities in Metropolitan Stockholm, Sundbyberg is not a bedroom suburb wherefrom people commute to Stockholm, but also a place commuted to from outside. In total, 19,000 commuters travel in each direction to or from Sundbyberg every day (in 2014). The unemployment rate in Sundbyberg closely tracks the average for Stockholm County and is generally lower than the Swedish average.

In the first half of its existence, Sundbyberg saw a strong expansion of industrial activity, and most residents were industrial workers, but in the 1940s the industry almost entirely disappeared from Sundbyberg. By the 1970s warehouses and IT businesses had established themselves instead, and an attempt to establish industry in Hallonbergen had failed due to high rental costs. Today the service sector dominates, with Sundbyberg having become a place with office workers, as a result of Sundbyberg becoming more central as Stockholm has expanded and public transport has been strengthened. The most common professions for people working in Sundbyberg are (in order from most employed): IT developer, banker, human relations, secretary, business seller/purchaser, accountant, retail clerk, truck/bus driver, teacher, tax collector. There are office districts in Central Sundbyberg (Sundbyberg centrum and Allén), Rissne (Ursviks Entré) and Hallonbergen (Sundby Park). In 2015 Sundbyberg centrum offices had rents (2,100 kr/m2/year) similar to Kista, Alvik and the adjacent Solna Business Park, while in Allén they a bit lower and similar to Lidingö Centrum and the nearby Solna Strand, and Ursviks Entré and Sundby Park both have further lower office rents similar to Farsta and Tyresö Centrum. 

Unusually for Stockholm suburbs, Sundbyberg has a proper town centre, with  plenty of nice shops in the Central Sundbyberg area, which makes the little city a bit independent. There are also smaller concentrations of stores elsewhere in the municipality, such as by the Rissne and Hallonbergen metro stations. The proximity of the shopping centres Bromma Blocks (1 km away) and Mall of Scandinavia (2 km away) has hindered establishment of a shopping centre in Central Sundbyberg. Businesses in Hallonbergen suffer from getting few customers from elsewhere due to the area's poor reputation, whereas the area's locals don't mind going elsewhere, e.g. to cafés in Central Sundbyberg.

Demography

Population development

Residents with a foreign background
On 31 December 2017 the number of people with a foreign background (persons born outside of Sweden or with two parents born outside of Sweden) was 20 229, or 40.93% of the population (49 424 on 31 December 2017). On 31 December 2002 the number of residents with a foreign background was (per the same definition) 8 531, or 25.24% of the population (33 797 on 31 December 2002). On 31 December 2017 there were 49 424 residents in Sundbyberg, of which 14 954 people (30.26%) were born in a country other than Sweden. Divided by country in the table below - the Nordic countries as well as the 12 most common countries of birth outside of Sweden for Swedish residents have been included, with other countries of birth bundled together by continent by Statistics Sweden.

By district

Public transportation

Sundbyberg is well served by the Stockholm public transport system. There are several metro stations as well as one Stockholm commuter rail station and plenty of bus routes. Even some main line trains call at Sundbyberg. The Tvärbanan light rail service was extended from Sickla Udde via Alvik to Solna centrum in October 2013. The line runs through Central Sundbyberg with tracks laid in the street and has two stops within the municipality. Construction of a northern light railway branch from Ulvsunda to Kista that will pass through Rissne and Stora Ursvik started in 2018.

Districts 

Brotorp
Central Sundbyberg
Duvbo
Hallonbergen
Lilla Alby
Lilla Ursvik
Kymlinge
Rissne
Stora Ursvik
Storskogen
Ör

Sports
The following sports clubs are located in Sundbyberg:
 Sundbybergs IK
 Storskogens SK

Gallery

References

Further reading

Sundbyberg Den nya Förstaden, H. Österberg,Sundbybergs Museum
Sundbyberg under Köpingtiden, H. Österberg,Sundbybergs Museum
Sundbyberg den 113:e Staden, H. Österberg,Sundbybergs Museum
Sundbyberg i Gamla Bilder, H. Österberg, Sundbybergs Museum
Sundbyberg bygger en Kyrka, H. Österberg, Sundbybergs Museum
Sundbyberg - om hus och miljöer, Eva Söderlind

External links

Sundbyberg Municipality - Official site
Sundbyberg Museum & Archive - Official site

Municipalities of Stockholm County
Municipal seats of Stockholm County
Swedish municipal seats
Populated places in Stockholm County
Metropolitan Stockholm
Stockholm urban area